"Excited" is a song by British band M People, released in September 1992 as the fourth and final single from their first album, Northern Soul (1991). The song was written by bandmembers Mike Pickering and Paul Heard, and peaked at number 29 on the UK Singles Chart and number four on the UK Dance Singles Chart. There were produced two different music videos for the single release.

Background
After three Top 40 hits, where each single had charted lower than the one before, M People went back into the studio to record some new tracks for a 1992 re-release of their debut album. Two tracks, "Excited" and "Man Smart", were chosen to replace the outgoing "Life" and "Platini". The band planned to release a revised track listing as well, and the track "Excited" was to be the opener, with its fresher, more fun sound. They were looking for a track that would take them from the underground to a more widespread and populist audience as the 1991 version of the album had only charted in the lower echelons of the chart.

Chart performance
When the single was released it sold in excess of 27,000 copies in its first week to enter the chart at 30, after their second Top of the Pops appearance the single sold slightly more (29,000 copies) to climb one place to its peak position of 29, equalling the peak position of the parent album's first single: "How Can I Love You More?" became their fourth consecutive Top 40 hit and second top thirty hit.

The song stayed in the Top 40 for three weeks, climbing from its entry position of 30 up to 29 and back down to 35 in its third week. For the final two weeks the single slid down to 53 and then, finally, to 74.

Critical reception
Larry Flick from Billboard wrote, "Few dance/pop albums are as consistently potent as this band's US debut, Elegant Slumming. On its third, top 40 offering, singer Heather Small bounces over a lively, Philly soul-influenced groove with a performance that is, by turns, giddy and hearty. Programmers with a savvy musical ear will feast on the cut's brassy horn flourishes and rollicking piano lines. Meanwhile, dancefloor enthusiasts will subscribe to the bass intensity and percolating breaks." A reviewer from Lennox Herald described "Excited" as a "very open and spacious dance track with classy vocal." Ian Gittins from Melody Maker opined that the band are let down "by seriously lame'n'lazy lyrics". Alan Jones from Music Week felt that here, M People are "operating at the more sophisticated end of the dance music spectrum." John Kilgo from The Network Forty declared the song as "an uptempo jammer".

Music video
There are two music videos for the single, one for the UK and one for the US.

The UK video was filmed in the summer of 1992, once the band had been in the studio to record Man Smart and Excited. And features Heather with her hair tied up, for the first time in two different poses. Primarily she wears a grey trouser suit over a black vest, the other scenes she sings from a red chaise longue, wearing a purple suede figure-hugging gown, surrounded by flowers, and her face is decorated with small white beads around her eyes. Throughout the video there are shots and silhouettes of Mike Pickering and Paul Heard all getting photographed together; Heather is seen performing separately.

In the US video, filmed in the summer of 1994, in between the 2nd and 3rd albums (Elegant Slumming and Bizarre Fruit). It features all members of the band, including Bizarre Fruit musicians: Andy Gangadeen on drums, backing vocalists Paul Johnson and Lynieve Austin and Percussionist Shovel, who at this point had become full member. Paul Heard plays keyboards and Mike Pickering on saxophone.

The band are all seen performing at an indoor LA Pool party from the side of the pool, meanwhile party revellers are dancing round the pool’s edge. Halfway through the song and leading towards the middle eight of “You and me, so Excited”, the revellers start to jump into the pool one by one and continue to have fun. The band plays on getting splashed by water but continue playing happily. The video through also has a gold hue throughout the pool -side video.

Artwork
The artwork of the CD single is simply 16 differently shaded red rectangles laid out in a 4 x 4 pattern with two of the boxes coloured a starkly bright yellow. The name of the single is in white font on a black banner with a smaller signature Red Rose (last seen on previous single Someday) to the top centre left.

The UK album artwork is slightly different with the same 16 differently shaded red rectangles laid out in a 4 x 4 pattern but two of the yellow boxes are in a different arrangement and the black title banner across the top.

The US artwork also has the same 16 differently shaded red rectangles laid out in a 4 x 4 pattern but two of the yellow boxes are in a different arrangement; one in the bottom right corner on the 12-inch/bottom centre right on the CD single) the other is mid-centre right above the centre banner and contains an image of the Elegant Slumming album cover sofa portrait featuring Mike, Paul and Shovel – as the single featured on the US version of that album.

Track listings

 7-inch mini
 "Excited" (Radio Edit)			3:46
 "Excited" (M People Dub)			5:00

 12-inch maxi (UK)
 "Excited" (M People Master Mix)	5:00
 "Excited" (M People Dub)			5:00
 "Excited" (Judge Jules Remix)	7:21
 "Excited" (M People Remix)	   	5:30

 CD maxi (UK)
 "Excited" (Radio Edit)			3:46
 "Excited" (Judge Jules Remix)		7:21
 "Excited" (M People Master Mix) 	5:00
 "Excited" (M People Remix)	   	5:30
 "Excited" (M People Dub)	   		5:00
 "Excited" (Judge Jules Dub)	   	5:39

 12-inch maxi (US)
 "Excited" (MK Mix)	  			8:32
 "Excited" (MK T Mix)				8:10
 "Excited" (M People Master Mix)	5:00
 "Excited" (MK Snow-Call Dub)	   	7:33
 "Excited" (M People Dub)	   		5:00

 CD Maxi (US)
 "Excited" (Radio Edit)			3:46
 "Excited" (MK 7-inch Edit)	    3:51
 "Excited" (M People Master Mix)   5:00
 "Excited" (Judge Jules Remix)	  	7:21
 "Excited" (MK Mix)	  			8:32

Charts

References

1991 songs
1992 singles
Deconstruction Records singles
M People songs
RCA Records singles
Songs written by Mike Pickering
Songs written by Paul Heard